Epistylis is a genus of usually colonial peritrich ciliates with a short oral disc and collar, and a rigid stalk. The rigid stalk differentiates Epistylis from the very similar genus Carchesium in which the stalks are contractile like those in ''Vorticella.

References

Oligohymenophorea
Ciliate genera
Taxa named by Christian Gottfried Ehrenberg